A General Theory of Love is a book about the science of human emotions and biological psychiatry written by Thomas Lewis, Fari Amini and Richard Lannon, psychiatry professors at the University of California, San Francisco, and first published by Random House in 2000.  It has since been reissued twice, with new editions appearing in 2001 and 2007.

Overview
The book examines the phenomenon of love and human connection from a combined scientific and cultural perspective. It attempts to reconcile the language and insights of humanistic inquiry and cultural wisdom (literature, song, poetry, painting, sculpture, dance and philosophy) with the more recent findings of social science, neuroscience and evolutionary biology.  Presenting scientific facts and hypotheses through engaging prose, A General Theory of Love has been compared to the work of Steven Pinker and Oliver Sacks.  Since its first publication, the book has been translated into Spanish, Chinese, Japanese, Portuguese, Korean, Latvian, Croatian, and Persian.

Contents
The book surveys scientific understanding of emotions and particularly intimacy and love, from Freud through modern neuroscience, with a focus on the emerging understanding of the limbic brain and the development of personality.    The authors put forward the idea that our nervous systems are not separate or self-contained; beginning in earliest childhood, the areas of our brain identified as the limbic system (hippocampus, amygdala, anterior thalamic nuclei, and limbic cortex) is affected by those closest to us (limbic resonance) and synchronizes with them (limbic regulation) in a way that has profound implications for personality and lifelong emotional health.  The authors maintain that various forms of therapy are effective not so much by virtue of their underlying theory or methodology, but to the degree to which the therapist is able to empathetically modify these set patterns (limbic revision).  The authors go on to examine how many aspects of our society and social institutions have been constructed in a way that is incompatible with our innate biology, which gives rise to individual and social pathologies.

Critical reception
A General Theory of Love received generally positive reviews, including Kirkus Reviews, Library Journal, the Washington Post, and the San Francisco Examiner.
It reached number 5 slot on the San Francisco Chronicle's Non-Fiction best seller list.
However, the book has been criticized for its "convoluted and opaque" prose style, as well as its extensive reliance on the model of the triune brain as defined by Paul D. MacLean, a model that has been variously categorized as obsolete, imprecise or unnecessary.

See also
Affective neuroscience
Limbic resonance
Limbic regulation
Limbic revision

References

External links
Fari Amini, 73; Used Science To Study Love, The New York Times.
American Scientist, book review by Roger Martin.
Entertainment Weekly, book review by Clarissa Cruz.
The Permanente Journal, book review by Vincent J Felitti, MD.
The New York Times, book review by Liesl Schillinger.

2000 non-fiction books
Psychology books